United Nations Security Council resolution 1107, adopted unanimously on 16 May 1997, after recalling Resolution 1103 (1997) on the United Nations Mission in Bosnia and Herzegovina (UNMIBH) and United Nations International Police Task Force (UN-IPTF) in Bosnia and Herzegovina, the Council authorised a further increase in the number of police personnel of UNMIBH.

The Security Council recalled the Dayton Agreement and increased the size of the police component of UNMIBH by 120 personnel, following a recommendation by the Secretary-General Kofi Annan concerning the tasks of the UN-IPTF. Member States were urged to provide qualified police monitors and other forms of assistance to the UN-IPTF and in support of the Dayton Agreement.

See also
 Bosnian War
 List of United Nations Security Council Resolutions 1101 to 1200 (1997–1998)
 Yugoslav Wars

References

External links
 
Text of the Resolution at undocs.org

 1107
 1107
1997 in Yugoslavia
1997 in Bosnia and Herzegovina
 1107
May 1997 events